Darryl Matthews McDaniels (born May 31, 1964), better known by his stage name DMC, is an American rapper. He is a founding member of the hip hop group Run-DMC, and is considered one of the pioneers of hip hop culture.

Early life
McDaniels grew up in Hollis, Queens. He was born to an unwed mother who surrendered him to the New York Foundling home. He was a ward of the Foundling, in foster care, until placed with the McDaniels and eventually adopted by them. They raised him as a Catholic. He attended Rice High School in Manhattan and later enrolled in St. John's University in Queens.

McDaniels first became interested in hip hop music after listening to recordings of Grandmaster Flash and the Furious Five. In 1978, McDaniels taught himself to DJ in the basement of his parents' home, using turntables and a mixer that he bought with his older brother, Alford, after having a comic book sale in their neighborhood. During this period he adopted the stage name "Grandmaster Get High".

Career
Later that year, McDaniels sold his DJ equipment, after his friend Joseph "Run" Simmons acquired his own turntables and mixer. After Jam-Master Jay – who had a reputation as the best young DJ in Hollis – joined the group, Run encouraged McDaniels to rap rather than DJ. Gradually, McDaniels came to prefer rapping to mixing records, and adopted the nickname of "Easy D". In 1981, he dropped the "Easy D" moniker in favor of "DMcD", the way he signed his work in school, and then to the shorter "D.M.C.". This new nickname alternately stood for "Devastating Mic Control" or "Darryl Mac", his nickname since childhood as referenced in the lyrics of the song "King of Rock".

In 1984, the trio released their self-titled debut album and became very successful in the hip-hop industry. The group's success continued to grow and reached its peak with their third album Raising Hell. The album went to No. 6 on the Billboard 200 and No. 1 on the Top R&B/Hip-Hop Albums chart, making Run-D.M.C. the most popular hip-hop group at the time. During this time, McDaniels began to build a reputation as a heavy drinker. He was known to drink up to eight 40-ounce bottles of malt liquor a day and was arrested twice for public intoxication and driving while intoxicated. In 1987 Run-D.M.C. wrote "Christmas in Hollis" for A Very Special Christmas. The music video for "Christmas in Hollis" was shot in Hollis, Queens. Run-D.M.C. filmed the video during their 1987 tour. DMC's mother made a guest appearance in the video.

In 1997, McDaniels began to develop a deep depression. He became extremely unhappy with the rigorous routine of touring and performing, and with being away from his wife and newborn son. He began to rely heavily on prescription drugs and alcohol to ease the pain. While on tour, McDaniels noticed his voice was giving out. He was later diagnosed with spasmodic dysphonia, a vocal disorder which causes involuntary spasms of the larynx muscles. He believes it was caused by the aggressive way in which he performs his lyrics compounded with the years of heavy drinking.

Meanwhile, McDaniels began to have creative differences with his bandmates in Run-D.M.C., which by then, was well past its prime as a commercially successful hip-hop group. A longtime fan of artists such as The Beatles, Bob Dylan, and Harry Chapin, McDaniels wanted to move towards a slower, softer sound which suited his now troubled voice. Run wanted to continue with the aggressive, hard rock-edged, sound that the group was known for. These disagreements caused McDaniels to sit out most of the recording of Crown Royal (2001). He appeared on only three songs.

Feeling depressed and suicidal, McDaniels heard fellow adoptee Sarah McLachlan's song "Angel" (1997) on the radio. The song touched McDaniels so deeply that it inspired him to reassess his life and career. He credits McLachlan and her album Surfacing (on which "Angel" appeared) with saving his life. With a new outlook on life, McDaniels decided to write his autobiography. While researching his early years, his mother, Bannah, revealed a shocking secret: Darryl had been placed for adoption when he was three months old. According to Bannah, his birth mother was a woman of Dominican descent named Bernada Lovelace. He also learned that he was born in Harlem, Manhattan, not Hollis, Queens, as he had always believed. Even as a child, McDaniels knew he did not look like the rest of his family, and with the revelation, he finally understood why. The news inspired him to search for his birth mother. He began working with the VH1 network on a documentary chronicling his quest. His autobiography, King of Rock: Respect, Responsibility, and My Life with Run-DMC, was released in January 2001.

In February 2006, VH1 premiered the documentary titled DMC: My Adoption Journey. The program ends with McDaniels reuniting with his birth mother, who turned out to be named Berncenia and despite previous beliefs, was not, in fact, of Dominican descent. He thanks her for her choice because had he not been placed for adoption, Run-D.M.C. would have never existed. In March 2006, McDaniels released his solo album, Checks Thugs and Rock N Roll. Produced and Music Directed by Romeo Antonio. The first single, "Just Like Me", features an interpolation of Harry Chapin's "Cat's in the Cradle" (1974) performed by McDaniels' musical savior, Sarah McLachlan. During a recording session, McLachlan revealed to McDaniels that she, too, had been adopted.

McDaniels also collaborated with Adoptee Zara Philips on "I'm Legit." He testified before the New Jersey State Legislature in support of legislation to restore adopted adults' access to their original birth certificates. The legislation McDaniels supported was signed by Governor Chris Christie and became effective on January 1, 2017. As a New York born adoptee, however, McDaniels did not have access to his own original birth record---he  hired a private investigator to help find his birth family in New York.

McDaniels had written the first draft of his autobiography before learning he was adopted and was working on a second solo album, working titled The Next Level. Three tracks off the new album have been released ("Next Level", "Hip Hop", and "Beef Eater") and can be heard on his Myspace page.

In June 2007, McDaniels joined Aerosmith on stage at the Hard Rock Calling festival in London, England to perform "Walk This Way".

McDaniels is featured in the video game Guitar Hero: Aerosmith (2008) singing Run-D.M.C.'s singles "King of Rock" and "Walk This Way". He is also an unlockable guitarist in the game. In the game's trailer, it is revealed that McDaniels' son plays Guitar Hero for hours each day.

In 2009, McDaniels performed in The People Speak, a documentary feature film that uses dramatic and musical performances of the letters, diaries, and speeches of everyday Americans, based on historian Howard Zinn's nonfiction book A People's History of the United States (1980).

McDaniels' second solo album, the more rock oriented The Origins Of Block Music, was due out in mid-2010 but was delayed. In December 2010, McDaniels appeared with Talib Kweli, Mix Master Mike, and Ahmet Zappa on a cover of Frank Zappa's "Willie the Pimp" for The Frank Zappa AAAFNRAAAA Birthday Bundle 2010.

In 2011, McDaniels joined forces with producer Wade Martin to open the record label IME Records.

In 2014, McDaniels ventured into the comics industry with his own publishing imprint, Darryl Makes Comics. McDaniels explains his lifelong love of the medium thus:

Darryl Makes Comics' first book is DMC, a 90-page anthology graphic novel set in 1985 that features McDaniels as a superhero who confronts both criminals and other superheroes whose recklessness threatens innocent lives. The comic's version of DMC wears McDaniels' signature Adidas sneakers, fedora and rope chain, along with an elongated turtleneck that masks his face. The book is written by McDaniels and Damion Scott, and edited by Darryl Makes Comics' Editor-in-Chief, Edgardo Miranda-Rodriguez and Senior Editor Rigo "Riggs" Morales. Each chapter in the anthology is illustrated by a different artist, because, as McDaniels explained, " If DMC was really running around and bumped into four different people, they'd have four different descriptions of what he was like. We wanted each artist's work to relate to each character's view of DMC. If you saw him, you might say, "He came out of a spaceship and had all these things flying around him!" But then another dude is like, "No! He had a sword and shield!" We thought, if so many people saw something different in DMC, we'd have to have different artwork to represent their opinions on him or their interpretation on him." In addition, graffiti writers such as MARE 139 were hired to give the shots of 1985 New York City graffiti a sense of authenticity. The book features an introduction by Greg Pak, a cover by Sal Buscema and Bob Wiacek and interior pinups by Carlos Pacheco, Chris Burnham, ChrisCross, Dexter Vines, and Shelby Robertson, some of which are homages to iconic comics covers that influenced the creative staff as children. DMC debuted at the New York Comic Con October 9–12, and was subsequently released in comics shops October 29. The book received a four out of five stars rating by Tony Guerrero of Comic Vine, who lauded the charm and authenticity of the art.

As of January 2015, McDaniels was working with the band Generation Kill on a project entitled DMC Generation Kill, to be produced by former Guns N' Roses guitarist Ron "Bumblefoot" Thal.

On the December 17, 2016 Christmas episode of Saturday Night Live, DMC made a cameo appearance during a parody of Run DMC's "Christmas in Hollis." During the sketch he was portrayed by musical guest Chance the Rapper.

On February 17, 2016, heavy metal band Solus Deus released their EP titled The Plague. The song titled "Anacrime" features DMC on guest vocals.

Starting in 2017 and continuing on an ongoing basis, DMC has joined the rock cover supergroup Royal Machines as a guest at their occasional concerts. Joining a revolving cast of celebrities in each lineup, including Dave Navarro, Billy Morrison, Sebastian Bach, Macy Gray, Fred Durst, DMC has performed covers of songs such as "Walk This Way", "Sweet Emotion", and "Black Betty" with the band.

On September 15, 2017, Italian rapper Caparezza released his studio album titled Prisoner 709. The song titled "Forever Jung" features DMC on guest vocals.

On June 18, 2018, American rapper DeLiverance released his single titled "Slave To The Rhythm" features DMC on guest vocals.

On August 13, 2018, DMC performed an encore with O.A.R., playing "Walk This Way".

In February 2021, McDaniels released a song and animated video called "Let's All Get the Vaccine," to encourage the COVID-19 vaccination.
In January 2022, McDaniels released his picture book, Darryl's Dream, published by Random House.

Charity work

The Felix Organization

In 2006, McDaniels and Sheila Jaffe, a fellow adoptee and Emmy award-winning casting director, co-founded The Felix Organization.

Since its inception, The Felix Organization has served more than 10,000 children in the foster care system. Its flagship program, Camp Felix, is an annual sleepaway summer camp in Putnam Valley, New York. Additionally, The Felix Organization sponsors two teen camps on the East Coast. Camp Felix West is for Los Angeles-based youth in foster care.

Other charity work

In September 2006, McDaniels received the Congressional Angels in Adoption award for his work with children in foster care and promotion of adoption. He sits on the Board of Directors of Children's Rights, a national watchdog organization that reforms failing child welfare systems.

Personal life
McDaniels has been a resident of Wayne, New Jersey. He has been very frank about his battles with depression, including an appearance on Live From the Barrage, speaking at length about it. He also has written pieces in Men's Health and BlackDoctor, where he talked about his memoir, Ten Ways Not to Commit Suicide (Amistad, 2017).

Discography
With Run-D.M.C.

 Run-D.M.C. (1984)
 King of Rock (1985)
 Raising Hell (1986)
 Tougher Than Leather (1988)
 Back from Hell (1990)
 Down with the King (1993)
 Crown Royal (2001)

Solo
 Checks Thugs and Rock n Roll (2006)
 Back from the Dead EP  (2017)

With Fragile Mortals
 The Dark Project (2016)

Filmography

Video game appearances
 The Warriors – Scopes
 Guitar Hero: Aerosmith – Himself

References

External links

 
 
 
 "An Interview with DMC of Run DMC". Brooklyn Vegan. December 12, 2006 
 Diamond, Jay (June 26, 2008). "DMC". BritishHipHop.co.uk.
 McNamara, Mary (December 12, 2009). "'The People Speak'". Los Angeles Times

Run-DMC members
1964 births
Living people
American adoptees
East Coast hip hop musicians
African-American male rappers
People from Harlem
People from Hollis, Queens
People from Wayne, New Jersey
Rappers from New York City
20th-century American rappers
21st-century American rappers
African-American Catholics